Monte Argentera is a mountain in the Maritime Alps, in the province of Cuneo, Piedmont, northern Italy.

The peak is located in the upper Valle Gesso, on the boundary between the municipalities of Entracque and Valdieri. Geologically, it is formed by gneiss of various composition, with local outcrops of granite.

SOIUSA classification 
According to the SOIUSA (International Standardized Mountain Subdivision of the Alps) the mountain can be classified in the following way:
 main part = Western Alps
 major sector = South Western Alps
 section = Maritime Alps
 subsection = Alpi Marittime
 supergroup = Catena Argentera-Pépoiri-Matto
 group = Gruppo dell'Argentera
 subgroup = Massiccio dell'Argentera
 code = I/A-2.1-B.6.a

References

Sources

Mountains of Piedmont
Mountains of the Alps
Alpine three-thousanders
International mountains of Europe